Taxes provide the most important revenue source for the Government of the People's Republic of China. Tax is a key component of macro-economic policy, and greatly affects China's economic and social development. With the changes made since the 1994 tax reform, China has sought to set up a streamlined tax system geared to a socialist market economy.

China's tax revenue came to 11.05 trillion yuan (1.8 trillion U.S. dollars) in 2013, up 9.8 per cent over 2012. Tax revenue in 2015 was 12,488.9 billion yuan. In 2016, tax revenue was 13,035.4 billion yuan. Tax revenue in 2017 was 14,436 billion yuan. In 2018, tax revenue was 15,640.1 billion yuan, an increase of 1204.1 billion yuan over the previous year. Tax revenue in 2019 was 15799.2 billion yuan. In 2020 and 2021, the total tax revenues were respectively 15431 billion and 17273.1 billion Chinese yuan. The 2017 World Bank "Doing Business" rankings estimated that China's total tax rate for corporations was 68% as a percentage of profits through direct and indirect tax. As a percentage of GDP, according to the State Administration of Taxation, overall tax revenues were 30% in China.

The government agency in charge of tax policy is the Ministry of Finance. For tax collection, it is the State Administration of Taxation.

As part of a US$586 billion economic stimulus package in November 2008, the government planned to reform VAT, stating that the plan could cut corporate taxes by 120 billion yuan.

Types of taxes
Under the current tax system in China, there are 26 types of taxes, which, according to their nature and function, can be divided into the following 8 categories:

Turnover taxes. This includes three kinds of taxes, namely, Value-Added Tax, Consumption Tax and Business Tax. The levy of these taxes are normally based on the volume of turnover or sales of the taxpayers in the manufacturing, circulation or service sectors.
Income taxes. This includes Enterprise Income Tax (effective prior to 2008, applicable to such domestic enterprises as state-owned enterprises, collectively owned enterprises, private enterprises, joint operation enterprises and joint equity enterprises) and Individual Income Tax. These taxes are levied on the basis of the profits gained by producers or dealers, or the income earned by individuals. Please note that the new Enterprise Income Tax Law of the People's Republic of China has replaced the above two enterprise taxes as of 1 January 2008.
The enterprise income tax shall be levied at the rate of 25%. 15% tax rate is a concession rate for high-tech companies.
Resource taxes. This consists of Resource Tax and Urban and Township Land Use Tax. These taxes are applicable to the exploiters engaged in natural resource exploitation or to the users of urban and township land. These taxes reflect the chargeable use of state-owned natural resources, and aim to adjust the different profits derived by taxpayers who have access to different availability of natural resources.
Taxes for special purposes. These taxes are City Maintenance and Construction Tax, Farmland Occupation Tax, Fixed Asset Investment Orientation Regulation Tax, Land Appreciation Tax, and Vehicle Acquisition Tax. These taxes are levied on specific items for special regulative purposes.
Property taxes. This encompasses House Property Tax, Urban Real Estate Tax, and Inheritance Tax (not yet levied). China is preparing to roll out a new property tax. Two of China’s largest cities, Chongqing and Shanghai have trialed property taxes between 0.4% and 1.2% since 2011, mainly targeting second homes, luxury properties, and purchases by non-residents. The new tax is expected to cover a much wider range of properties.
Behavioural taxes. This includes Vehicle and Vessel Usage Tax, Vehicle and Vessel Usage License Plate Tax, Stamp Tax, Deed Tax, Securities Exchange Tax (not yet levied), Slaughter Tax and Banquet Tax. These taxes are levied on specified behaviour.
Agricultural taxes. Taxes belonging to this category are Agriculture Tax (including Agricultural Specialty Tax) and Animal Husbandry Tax which are levied on the enterprises, units and/or individuals receiving income from agriculture and animal husbandry activities.
Customs duties. Customs duties are imposed on the goods and articles imported into and exported out of the territory of the People's Republic of China, including Excise Tax.

Tax characteristics
Compared with other forms of distribution, taxation has the characteristics of compulsory, gratuitous and fixed, which are customarily called the "three characteristics" of taxation.

Compulsory 
The compulsory nature of taxation means that taxation is imposed by the state as a social administrator, by virtue of its power and political authority, through the enactment of laws or decrees. The social groups and members who are obliged to pay taxes must comply with the compulsory tax decree of the state. Within the limits stipulated by the national tax law, taxpayers must pay taxes according to the law, otherwise they will be sanctioned by the law, which is the embodiment of the legal status of taxes. The compulsory character is reflected in two aspects: on the one hand, the establishment of tax distribution relations is compulsory, i.e. tax collection is entirely by virtue of the political power of the state; on the other hand, the process of tax collection is compulsory, i.e. if there is a tax violation, the state can impose punishment according to the law.

Gratuitousness 
The gratuitous nature of taxation means that through taxation, a part of the income of social groups and members of society is transferred to the state, and the state does not pay any remuneration or consideration to the taxpayer. This gratuitous nature of taxation is connected with the essence of income distribution by the state by virtue of its political power. The gratuitousness is reflected in two aspects: on the one hand, it means that the government does not have to pay any remuneration directly to the taxpayers after receiving the tax revenues; on the other hand, it means that the tax revenues collected by the government are no longer returned directly to the taxpayers. The gratuitous nature of taxation is the essence of taxation, which reflects a unilateral transfer of ownership and dominance of social products, rather than an exchange relationship of equal value. The gratuitous nature of taxation is an important characteristic that distinguishes tax revenue from other forms of fiscal revenue.

Fixedness 
The fixed nature of taxation refers to the fact that taxation is levied in accordance with the standards stipulated by the state law, i.e. the taxpayers, tax objects, tax items, tax rates, valuation methods and time periods are pre-defined by the taxation law and have a relatively stable trial period, which is a fixed continuous income. For the pre-defined standard of taxation, both the taxing and tax-paying parties must jointly abide by it, and neither the taxing nor the tax-paying parties can violate or change this fixed rate or amount or other institutional provisions unless it is revised or adjusted by the state law.

Summing up 
The three basic features of taxation are a unified whole. Among them, compulsory is the strong guarantee to realize the gratuitous collection of tax, gratuitous is the embodiment of the essence of taxation, and fixed is the inevitable requirement of compulsory and gratuitous.

Taxation Functions 

Taxation is divided into national tax and local tax. Local taxes are further divided into: resource tax, personal income tax, individual incidental income tax, land value-added tax, urban maintenance and construction tax, vehicle and vessel use tax, property tax, slaughter tax, urban land use tax, fixed asset investment direction adjustment tax, enterprise income tax, stamp duty, etc.

Taxes are mainly used for national defense and military construction, national civil servants' salary payment, road traffic and urban infrastructure construction, scientific research, medical and health epidemic prevention, culture and education, disaster relief, environmental protection and other fields.

The functions and roles of taxation are the concrete manifestation of the essence of taxation functions. Generally speaking, taxation has several important basic functions as follows:

Organizing finance 
Taxation is a form of distribution in which the government participates in social distribution by virtue of state coercive power and concentrates part of the surplus products (whether in monetary form or in physical form). The organization of state revenue is the most basic function of taxation.

Regulating the economy 
The participation of the government in social distribution by means of state coercive power necessarily changes the share of social groups and their members in the distribution of national income, reducing their disposable income, but this reduction is not equal, and this gain or loss of interest will affect the economic activity capacity and behavior of taxpayers, which in turn has an impact on the social and economic structure. The government uses this influence to purposefully guide the socio-economic activities and thus rationalize the socio-economic structure.

Monitoring the economy 
In the process of collecting and obtaining revenues, the state must build on the basis of intensive daily tax administration, specifically grasp the sources of taxes, understand the situation, find out problems, supervise taxpayers paying taxes in accordance with the law, and fight against violations of tax laws and regulations, thus supervising the direction of social and economic activities and maintaining the order of social life.

The role of taxation is the effect of the tax function under certain economic conditions. The role of taxation is to reflect the fair tax burden and promote equal competition; to regulate the total economic volume and maintain economic stability; to reflect the industrial policy and promote structural adjustment; to reasonably adjust the distribution and promote common prosperity; to safeguard the rights and interests of the country and promote the opening up to the outside world, etc.

Tax legislation
Tax law, that is, the legal system of taxation, is the general name of the legal norms that adjust tax relations and is an important part of the national law. It is a legal code based on the Constitution, which adjusts the relationship between the state and members of the society in terms of rights and obligations in taxation, maintains the social and economic order and taxation order, protects the national interests and the legitimate rights and interests of taxpayers, and is a rule of conduct for the state taxation authorities and all tax units and individuals to collect taxes according to the law.
Tax laws can be classified in different ways according to their legislative purposes, taxation objects, rights and interests, scope of application and functional roles. Generally, tax laws are divided into two categories: substantive tax laws and procedural tax laws according to the different functions of tax laws.
Tax legal relationship is reflected as the relationship between state tax collection and taxpayers' benefit distribution. In general, tax legal relations, like other legal relations, are composed of three aspects: subject, object and content.
The elements of tax law are the basic elements of the taxation system, which are reflected in the various basic laws enacted by the state. They mainly include taxpayers, tax objects, tax items, tax rates, tax deductions and exemptions, tax links, tax deadlines and violations. Among them, taxpayers, tax objects and tax rates are the basic factors of a taxation system or a basic composition of taxation.
The Law of the People's Republic of China on Tax Collection and Administration stipulates that taxpayers must apply for tax declaration at taxation authorities within the prescribed declaration period. By virtue of the power granted by the state power, the tax authorities collect taxes from taxpayers in the name of the state power. If a taxpayer steals tax, owes tax, cheats tax or resists tax, the tax authorities shall recover the tax, late payment and impose fines according to the law, and those who violate the criminal law shall also be criminally punished by the judicial authorities.
Tax evasion is a taxpayer's intentional violation of the tax law by deception, concealment and other means (such as forgery, alteration, concealment, unauthorized destruction of books and bookkeeping vouchers, false tax declaration, etc.) to not pay or underpay the tax due.
Tax arrears is the act that the taxpayer fails to pay tax on time and defaults on the tax payment beyond the approved tax payment period by the taxation authority.
Tax fraud is the act of taxpayers or personnel cheating the state export tax refund by false export declaration or other deceptive means. In China, export tax refund is to refund or exempt the VAT and consumption tax paid or payable by the taxpayer for the exported goods in the domestic production and circulation links. Export tax refund is an international practice.
Tax resistance is the refusal of a taxpayer to pay tax by violence or threat. Those who gather a crowd, threaten or besiege taxation authorities and beat taxation cadres, and refuse to pay taxes, are tax resisters.

State organs that have the authority to formulate tax laws or tax policy include the National People's Congress and its Standing Committee, the State Council, the Ministry of Finance, the State Administration of Taxation, the Tariff and Classification Committee of the State Council, and the General Administration of Customs.

Tax laws are enacted by the National People's Congress, e.g., the Individual Income Tax Law of the People's Republic of China; or enacted by the Standing Committee of the National People's Congress, e.g., the Tax Collection and Administration Law of the People's Republic of China.

The administrative regulations and rules concerning taxation are formulated by the State Council, e.g., the Detailed Rules for the Implementation of the Tax Collection and Administration Law of the People' s Republic of China, the Detailed Regulations for the Implementation of the Individual Income Tax Law of the People's Republic of China, the Provisional Regulations of the People's Republic of China on Value Added Tax.

The departmental rules concerning taxation are formulated by the Ministry of Finance, the State Administration of Taxation, the Tariff and Classification Committee of the State Council, and the General Administration of Customs, e.g., the Detailed Rules for the Implementation of the Provisional Regulations of the People's Republic of China on Value Added Tax, the Provisional Measures for Voluntary Reporting of the Individual Income Tax.

The formulation of tax laws follow four steps: drafting, examination, voting and promulgation. The four steps for the formulation of tax administrative regulations and rules are: planning, drafting, verification and promulgation. The four steps mentioned above take place in accordance with laws, regulations and rules.

Besides, the laws of China stipulates that within the framework of the national tax laws and regulations, some local tax regulations and rules may be formulated by the People's Congress at the provincial level and its Standing Committee, the People's Congress of minority nationality autonomous prefectures and the People's Government at provincial level.

The following table summarises up the current tax laws, regulations and rules and relevant legislation in China.

Current Tax Legislation Table

Note: The provisions of criminal responsibilities in Supplementary Rules of the Standing Committee of NPC of the People's Republic of China on Penalizing Tax Evasions and Refusal to Pay Taxes and Resolutions of the Standing Committee of NPC of the People's Republic of China on Penalizing Any False Issuance, Forgery and/or Illegal Sales of VAT Invoices have been integrated into the Criminal Law of the People's Republic of China revised and promulgated on 14 March 1997.

Foreign investment taxation
There are 14 kinds of taxes currently applicable to the enterprises with foreign investment, foreign enterprises and/or foreigners, namely: Value Added Tax, Consumption Tax, Business Tax, Income Tax on Enterprises with Foreign Investment and Foreign Enterprises, Individual Income Tax, Resource Tax, Land Appreciation Tax, Urban Real Estate Tax, Vehicle and Vessel Usage License Plate Tax, Stamp Tax, Deed Tax, Slaughter Tax, Agriculture Tax, and Customs Duties.

Hong Kong, Macau and Taiwan and overseas Chinese and the enterprises with their investment are taxed in reference to the taxation on foreigners, enterprises with foreign investment and/or foreign enterprises. In an effort to encourage inward flow of funds, technology and information, China provides numerous preferential treatments in foreign taxation, and has successively concluded tax treaties with 60 countries (by July 1999): Japan, the US, France, UK, Belgium, Germany, Malaysia, Norway, Denmark, Singapore, Finland, Canada, Sweden, New Zealand, Thailand, Italy, the Netherlands, Poland, Australia, Bulgaria, Pakistan, Kuwait, Switzerland, Cyprus, Spain, Romania, Austria, Brazil, Mongolia, Hungary, Malta, the UAE, Luxembourg, South Korea, Russia, Papua New Guinea, India, Mauritius, Croatia, Belarus, Slovenia, Israel, Vietnam, Turkey, Ukraine, Armenia, Jamaica, Iceland, Lithuania, Latvia, Uzbekistan, Bangladesh, Yugoslavia, Sudan, Macedonia, Egypt, Portugal, Estonia, and Laos, 51 of which have been in force.

Urban and Township Land Use Tax
(1) Taxpayers

The taxpayers of Urban and Township Land Use Tax include all enterprises, units, individual household businesses and other individuals (excluding enterprises with foreign investment, foreign enterprises and foreigners).

(2) Tax payable per unit

Urban Land Use Tax in China applies regional range differential fixed Tax Rate  i.e, the annual amount of tax payable per square meter is: 1.5-30 yuan for large cities, 1.2-24 yuan for medium-size cities, 0.9-18 yuan for small cities, or 0.6-12 yuan for mining districts. Upon approval, the tax payable per unit for poor area may be lowered or that for developed area may be raised to some extent.

(3) Computation

The amount of tax payable is computed on the basis of the actual size of the land occupied by the taxpayers and by applying the specified applicable tax payable per unit. The formula is:

Tax payable = Size of land occupied ×Tax payable per unit

(4) Major exemptions

Tax exemptions may be given on land occupied by governmental organs, people's organizations and military units for their own use; land occupied by units for their own use which are financed by the institutional allocation of funds from financial departments of the State; land occupied by religious temples, parks and historic scenic spots for their own use; land for public use occupied by Municipal Administration, squares and green land; land directly utilized for production in the fields of agriculture, forestry, animal husbandry and fishery industries; land used for water reservation and protection; and land occupied for energy and transportation development upon approval of the State.

City Maintenance and Construction Tax
(1) Taxpayers

The enterprises of any nature, units, individual household businesses and other individuals (excluding enterprises with foreign investment, foreign enterprises and foreigners) who are obliged to pay Value Added Tax, consumption Tax and/or Business Tax are the taxpayers of City Maintenance and Construction Tax.

(2) Tax rates and computation of tax payable

Differential rates are adopted: 7%  rate for city area, 5% rate for county and township area and 1% rate for other area. The tax is based on the actual amount of VAT, Consumption Tax and/or Business Tax paid by the taxpayers, and paid together with the three taxes mentioned above.  The formula for calculating the amount of the tax payable:

Tax payable = Tax base × tax rate Applicable.

Fixed Assets Investment Orientation Regulation Tax
(1) Taxpayers

This tax is imposed on enterprises, units, individual household businesses and other individuals who invest into fixed assets within the territory of the People's Republic of China (excluding enterprises with foreign investment, foreign enterprises and foreigners).

(2) Taxable items and tax rates

Table of Taxable Items and Tax Rates:

(* For some residential building investment projects, the rate is 5%.)

(3) Computation of tax payable

This tax is based on the total investment actually put into fixed assets. For renewal and transformation projects, the tax is imposed on the investment of the completed part of the construction project. The formula for calculating the tax payable is:

Tax payable - Amount of investment completed or amount of investment in construction project × Applicable rate

Land Appreciation Tax

(3) Computation of tax payable

To calculate the amount of Land Appreciation Tax payable, the first step is to arrive at the appreciation amount derived by the taxpayer from the transfer of real estate, which equals to the balance of proceeds received by the taxpayer on the transfer of real estate after deducting the sum of relevant deductible items. Then the amount of tax payable shall be calculated respectively for different parts of the appreciation by applying the applicable tax rates in line with the percentages of the appreciation amount over the sum of the deductible items. The sum of the amount of tax payable for different parts of the appreciation shall be the full amount of tax payable by the taxpayers. The formula is:

Tax payable = Σ (Part of appreciation ×Applicable rate)

(4) Major exemptions

The Land Appreciation Tax shall be exempt in situations where the appreciation amount on the sale of ordinary standard residential buildings construction by taxpayers for sale does not exceed 20% of the sum of deductible items and when the real estate is taken over or repossessed in accordance to the laws due to the construction requirements of the State.

Urban Real Estate Tax
(1) Taxpayers

-At present, this tax is only applied to enterprises with foreign investment, foreign enterprises and foreigners, and levied on house property only.

Taxpayers are owners, mortgagees custodians and/or users of house property.

(2) Tax base, tax rates and computation of tax payable

-Two different rates are applied to two different bases: one rate of 1. 2% is applied to the value of house property, and the other rate of 18% is applied to the rental income from the property. The formula for calculating House Property Tax payable is:

Tax payable = Tax base ×Applicable rate

(3) Major exemptions and reductions

-Newly constructed buildings shall be exempt from the tax for three years commencing from the month in which the construction is completed. Renovated buildings for which the renovation expenses exceed one half of the expenses of the new construction of such buildings shall be exempt from the tax for two years commencing from the month in which the renovation is completed. Other house property may be granted tax exemption or reduction for special reasons by the People's Government at provincial level or above.

Vehicle and Vessel Usage License Plate Tax
(1) Taxpayers

At this moment, this tax is only applied to the enterprises with foreign investment, foreign enterprises, and foreigners. The users of the taxable vehicles and vessels are taxpayers of this tax.

(2) Tax amount per unit

The tax amount per unit is different for vehicles and vessels:

a. Tax amount per unit for vehicles: 15-80 yuan per passenger vehicle per quarter; 4-15 yuan per net tonnage per quarter for cargo vehicles; 5-20 yuan per motorcycle per quarter. 0.3-8 yuan per non-motored vehicle per quarter.

b. Tax amount per unit for vessels: 0.3- 1.1 yuan per net tonnage per quarter for motorized vessels; 0.15-0.35 yuan per non-motorized vessel.

(3) Computation

The tax base for vehicles is the quantity or the net tonnage of taxable vehicles The tax base for vessels is the net-tonnage or the deadweight tonnage of the taxable vessels. The formula for computing the tax payable is:

a. Tax payable = Quantity (or net-tonnage ) of taxable vehicles × Applicable tax amount per unit
b. Tax payable = Net-tonnage (or deadweight tonnage) of taxable vessels × Applicable tax amount per unit

(4) Exemptions

a. Tax exemptions may be given on the vehicles used by Embassies and Consulates in China; the vehicles used by diplomatic representatives, consuls, administrative and technical staffs and their spouses and non-grown-up children living together with them.

b. Tax exemptions may be given as stipulated in some provinces and municipalities on the fire vehicles, ambulances, water sprinkling vehicles and similar vehicles of enterprises with foreign investment and foreign enterprises.

Individual income tax

From October 1, 2018

Tax exemption: 5000 RMB for both residents and not residents.

Taxable income = income - tax exemption

Monthly tax formula: (taxable income * tax rate) - quick deduction = tax

Example: ((10000 - 5000) * 10%) - 210 = 290 RMB in taxes

Note that both, tax rate and quick deduction, are based on the 'income' AFTER the 'tax exemption': the 'taxable income'.

New Package of Tax-and-fee policies 
Chinese government will implement a new package of tax-and-fee policies to support enterprises, as illustrated in Report on the Work of the Government in 2022. The Chinese government will continue to take temporary steps and institutional measures and apply policies for both tax reductions and refunds.

The State Administration of Taxation said that tax reduction and fee reduction are the fairest, most direct and most effective measures to help enterprises relieve their difficulties. In 2022, Chinese economic development is facing the triple pressure of demand contraction, supply shock, and weakening expectations. The Party Central Committee and the State Council have deployed and implemented a new package of tax-and-fee supporting policies, which include both phased measures and institutional arrangements. There are deferred tax rebate measures; there are generally applicable burden reduction policies and special assistance measures in specific fields; there are continuous arrangements and new deployments; there are policies uniformly implemented by the central government, and there are local autonomous implementations in accordance with the law.

On the basis of 2021, it is expected that year 2022's tax rebate will be about 2.5 trillion Chinese yuan, which will be the largest scale in history, exceeding the general expectations of the society before. Manufacturing is the foundation of the real economy and national competitiveness, and the main players in the small, medium and micro market are the key to ensuring people's livelihood and stabilizing employment. The tax and fee reduction policies implemented in recent years, regardless of the scale or magnitude, are the main beneficiary groups and industries for small, medium and micro market entities and the manufacturing industry. In 2022, the new package of tax-and-fee policies will continue to focus on this key point, maintain the continuity and stability of the policy, and show the characteristics of annual intensification, step-by-step expansion, and gradual progress. Scope of application, a series of policies, such as phased exemption of small-scale taxpayers' value-added tax, and increased income tax reduction for small and low-profit enterprises, will help manufacturing enterprises to go into battle lightly and develop better, and support small, medium and micro market players to overcome difficulties and continue to development and play an important supporting role.

Affected by uncertain factors such as the international environment, many companies are currently facing difficulties such as shortage of funds. In 2022, China has made great efforts to improve the VAT credit and refund system, and implemented large-scale tax refunds for the remaining tax credits. Priority is given to small and micro enterprises. The existing tax credits for small and micro enterprises will be refunded in one go before the end of June, and the incremental tax credits will be sufficient. The Chinese government focuses on supporting the manufacturing industry, and comprehensively solve the problem of tax refunds for industries such as manufacturing, scientific research and technical services, ecological and environmental protection, electricity and gas, and transportation.

In 2022, China will further increase the implementation of the super-deduction policy for R&D expenses, increase the super-deduction ratio of technology-based SMEs from 75% to 100%, implement tax incentives for enterprises investing in basic research, improve the accelerated depreciation of equipment and appliances, and the income tax for high-tech enterprises. Preferential policies and other policies to encourage enterprises to increase investment in research and development, cultivate and strengthen innovation momentum, and better promote high-quality development.

Statistics from the State Administration of Taxation show that in 2021, the country will add a total of 1,008.8 billion yuan in new tax cuts, and a total of 164.7 billion yuan in new fee reductions. From the perspective of different entities, the tax incentives for helping small and micro enterprises have continued to increase. In 2021, the tax incentives to support the development of small and micro enterprises will add 295.1 billion yuan in tax reduction, accounting for 29.3% of the new tax reduction nationwide. The "double" deduction of R&D expenses is beneficial to encourage innovation. In the whole year, 320,000 enterprises enjoyed the super deduction policy in advance, with a tax reduction of 333.3 billion yuan. Enterprises can enjoy more policy dividends earlier and more conveniently. The VAT retained tax refund system was optimized to support the real economy, continued to implement the incremental value-added tax retained tax refund policy, and processed 132.2 billion yuan in tax refunds for the manufacturing industry throughout the year, benefiting 31,000 enterprises. Among them, advanced manufacturing enterprises will fully refund the incremental value-added tax credits on a monthly basis, with an additional tax refund of 16.8 billion yuan in the whole year. The phased tax relief measures were implemented precisely to relieve difficulties. The reduction, refund and delay of tax of coal power and heating enterprises was 27.1 billion yuan, benefiting about 4,800 coal power and heating enterprises. The tax payment for small, medium and micro enterprises in the manufacturing industry was delayed and this fee exceeds 210 billion yuan.

In 2021, the macro tax burden, that is, the proportion of tax revenue in the national general public budget revenue to GDP, was 15.1%, a decrease of 0.1 percentage points from 2020 and a decrease of 3 percentage points from 2015 (18.1%). The income tax burden of key tax source enterprises operation for per 100 yuan decreased by 3.8% compared with 2020, and the cumulative decrease compared with 2015 was 21.7%. Thanks to various policies such as tax reduction and fee reduction, in 2021, the sales revenue of national enterprises increased by 21.1% year-on-year, 30.4% higher than that in 2019, and an average increase of 14.2% in the two years, maintaining a relatively rapid growth overall. The amount of equipment purchased by manufacturing enterprises across the country increased by 24.6% year-on-year, with an average increase of 14.3% in the two years.

Tax governance

As of 2007, a paper reported that about two-thirds of tax revenue was spent at the local level and that "the ratio of central revenue to total tax revenues reached a low of 22 per cent in 1993, before rising to the 50 per cent level following the 1994 tax reform".

Malware
Companies operating in China are required to use tax software from either Baiwang or Aisino (subsidiary of China Aerospace Science and Industry Corporation), highly sophisticated malware has been found in products from both vendors. Both sets of malware allowed for the theft of corporate secrets and other industrial espionage.

GoldenSpy
GoldenSpy was discovered in 2020 inside Aisino's Intelligent Tax Software, it allows system level access allowing an attacker nearly full control over an infected system. It was discovered that the Intelligent Tax software's uninstall feature would leave the malware in place if used.

After GoldenSpy was discovered its creator's attempted to scrub it from infected systems in an attempt to cover their tracks. The uninstaller was delivered directly through the tax software. A second more sophisticated version of the uninstaller was later deployed as well.

GoldenHelper
GoldenHelper was discovered after GoldenSpy and is an equally sophisticated malware program which was part of the Golden Tax Invoicing software from Baiwang which is used by all companies in China to pay VAT. While it was discovered after GoldenSpy GoldenHelper had been operating for longer. This discovery indicated that Chinese tax software was harboring malware for much longer than suspected.

See also
State Administration of Taxation
General Administration of Customs
Ministry of Finance
List of Chinese administrative divisions by tax revenues
Tax-Sharing Reform of China in 1994

References
An Overview of China's Tax System. 10-27-2007. State Administration of Taxation.
Tax System of the People's Republic of China. Beijing Local Taxation Bureau.

Further reading

Denis V. Kadochnikov (2019) Fiscal decentralization and regional budgets’ changing roles: a comparative case study of Russia and China, Area Development and Policy, DOI: 10.1080/23792949.2019.1705171

History 
Huang, R. Taxation and Governmental Finance in Sixteenth Century Ming China (Cambridge U. Press, 1974)

External links
The Economist. China's tax system. April 12, 2007.